The Type 520 Barbe-class utility landing craft are small units of the German Navy used for landing or transporting troops, supply, equipment and also for coastal mine laying.

The remaining boat in service is currently part of the SEK-M the naval special forces of Germany, however the navy plans to procure an entire new class of landing craft.

They are the only boats in the German Navy commanded by Chief Petty Officers.

List of ships

The ships are named after fish, with the exception of Delphin (dolphin) and Tümmler (toothed whales):

Barbe (barbel), Brasse (bream), Butt (flounder),  Dorsch (cod), Felchen (whitefish/Coregonus wartmanni), Forelle (trout), Karpfen (carp), Lachs (salmon), Makrele (mackerel), Rochen (stingray), Salm (salmon), Schlei (tench), Stör (sturgeon), Wels (catfish), and Zander (zander).

References

Landing craft